Events in the year 1829 in India.

Incumbents 
 Akbar II,  Mughal Emperor of Delhi

Law
 Measures against Thuggee and sati (practice) are introduced.
 4 December –  Bengal Sati Regulation, 1829

References

 
India
Years of the 19th century in India